This is a list of funk music artists. This includes artists who have either been very important to the funk genre or have had a considerable amount of exposure (such as in the case of one who has been on a major label). Bands are listed by the first letter in their name (not including the words "a", "an", or "the"), and individuals are listed by last name.

A

African Music Machine
Los Amigos Invisibles
Steve Arrington
Atlantic Starr
Average White Band

B

B. T. Express
Mike Banks
The Bar-Kays
Big Pig
Black Heat
Eddie Bo
Bootsy's Rubber Band
Brainstorm
Brand New Heavies
Brass Construction
Michael Brecker
Brick
The Brothers Johnson
James Brown
The Budos Band

C

Cameo
Jimmy Castor
Central Line
A Certain Ratio
Chakk
Chapter 8
Charles Wright & the Watts 103rd Street Rhythm Band
Chic
Chicks Incorporated
Chocolate Milk
George Clinton
Bootsy Collins
Catfish Collins
Lyn Collins
Commodores
Con Funk Shun
Nikka Costa
Don Covay
Crown Heights Affair

D

DAG
Betty Davis
Miles Davis
Dayton
Dazz Band
Deckchairs Overboard
Manu Dibango
Dr. John
George Duke
Candy Dulfer
Dumpstaphunk
Dyke and the Blazers
Dynasty

E

Earth, Wind & Fire
ESG

F

The Fabulous Counts
Fashion
Fat Larry's Band
Fatback Band
Faze-O
Amp Fiddler
Lee Fields
Flyte Tyme
Freeez
Fun Lovin' Criminals
Funkadelic

G

Galactic
The Gap Band
Marvin Gaye
Gonzalez
Graham Central Station
Larry Graham
The Grease Band
The Greyboy Allstars

H

Herbie Hancock
Isaac Hayes
Leon Haywood
The Headhunters
Heatwave
Jimi Hendrix
Here Come the Mummies
Hi-Tension
Hot Chocolate

I

Ian Dury and the Blockheads
Imagination
The Isley Brothers

J

The J.B.'s
Rick James
Jamiroquai
Sharon Jones & The Dap-Kings
Don Julian

K

Karma
Kay Gees
KC and the Sunshine Band
Eddie Kendricks
Chaka Khan
Kleeer
Klymaxx
Kool & the Gang
Fela Kuti

L

L.T.D.
Lakeside
Bill Laswell
Light of the World
Paula Lima
Linx
Carrie Lucas

M

Machine
Manchild
Mandrill
Manzel
Teena Marie
Material
Maximum Joy
Curtis Mayfield
Maze
The Meters
Mezzoforte
Miami Sound Machine
Mickey & the Soul Generation
Midnight Star
Mingo Fishtrap
Walter "Junie" Morrison
Mtume

N

Meshell Ndegeocello
N.E.R.D
Art Neville
The Nite-Liters

O

Ohio Players
Olympic Runners
Orgone
Osaka Monaurail
Ozomatli

P

Maceo Parker
Parliament
Parliament-Funkadelic
Teddy Pendergrass
The People's Choice
Pieces of a Dream
Prince

R

Jesse Rae
Nelson Rangell
Ready for the World
Republic of Loose
The Rimshots
Rip Rig + Panic
Ripple
Nile Rodgers
Rufus

S

Shakatak
Shalamar
Garry Shider
Shotgun
Side Effect
Dawn Silva
Skull Snaps
Skyy
Slave
Sly and the Family Stone
Soulive
Sound Experience
South Shore Commission
Sam Sparro
Spearhead
Stargard
Sly Stone
Sun
Switch
Swoop

T

T-Connection
T. S. Monk
A Taste of Honey
Richard Tee
The Temptations
Joe Tex
The Time
Tower of Power
Roger Troutman
TV on the Radio

V
Vulfpeck

W

War
Johnny "Guitar" Watson
Fred Wesley
The Whispers
The Whitefield Brothers
Barry White
Marva Whitney
Stevie Wonder
Phil Woods
Bernie Worrell

Z
Zapp

See also
List of funk metal and funk rock bands

References

Bibliography

Funk